KRYC-LP, also known as Rhythm 105.9, is a Rhythmic / Dance Top 40  hybrid outlet serving the Yuba City, CA, area. The station, which is owned by Irshad Ali Foundation and whose city of license is Yuba City, California, United States, broadcasts at 105.9 MHz.

External links
 KRYC website
U.S. Dance Radio Post
U.S. Dance Radio Megamix
 

RYC
Dance radio stations
RYC-LP